Wells College is a private liberal arts college in Aurora, New York. The college has cross-enrollment with Cornell University and Ithaca College. For much of its history it was a women's college.

Wells College is located in the Finger Lakes region of New York. It is within the Aurora Village–Wells College Historic District, listed on the National Register of Historic Places.

History

Wells was established as a women's college in 1868 by Henry Wells, co-founder of Wells Fargo and the American Express Company.  Wells had the building for Wells Seminary constructed on property he donated.  On August 9, 1888, the college's main building burned to the ground.  The building was replaced in 1890 by the current Main Building, designed by architect William Henry Miller.

In 1906 Henry Wells' 1852 mansion, Glen Park, was purchased by the Alumnae Association and given to the college for its use. It is now operated as a residence hall for upper-class Women and Nonbinary Identifying People.

In 1965, Walter Netsch designed the Louis Jefferson Long Library. The design of this award-winning building inspired two other buildings on campus, Barler Music Hall and Campbell Art Building.

In 1886, Frances Folsom, Wells Class of 1885, married President Grover Cleveland and became the youngest First Lady of the United States. She was the only First Lady to have her wedding in the White House, and she was the first First Lady to have graduated from college. Frances Cleveland (later Preston, after her second marriage) served on the college's board of trustees for 50 years. She helped bring the college to national prominence.

Co-education
After 136 years as a women's college, Wells announced on October 2, 2004 that it would become a co-educational institution in 2005. Students protested on campus against the change.  Some parents of students also became involved in the protests. Some of the students said that their protests were patterned after ones at Mills College in the early 1990s. A website called Wells for Women was established to organize support.  After the college's decision to adopt coeducation was approved by its board, students filed a lawsuit, which the courts rejected.

Financial difficulties
In 2020 the president of Wells College, Jonathan Gibralter, sent a letter to the college community reporting that financial issues related to the COVID-19 pandemic threatened the college's future, writing, "If New York State continues its mandate that our campus remain closed through all or part of the [2020] fall semester, Wells simply will not receive enough revenue to continue operations." Because Wells College receives about 15% of its operating revenue from its Italy-based study abroad program, a COVID-19-related postponement or termination of that program can seriously harm the college's financial standing.

Academics

In 2016, U.S. News ranked Wells at 174 (tied) among liberal arts colleges nationally.

Wells College has several study abroad programs, most notably in Florence, Italy. It has created centers in sustainability, business and entrepreneurship, and book arts. Undergraduate students are required to participate in at least two internships during their time at Wells, one of which must be off campus.

Athletics

Athletics are offered with half a PE credit earned for each season completed.

A member of the Private College Athletic Conference throughout the late 1970s and early 1980s, the Express sports teams of the college captured four consecutive conference championships in women's tennis (1977–78, 1978–79, 1979–80, 1980–81). They also won titles in women's bowling (1978–79, 1979–80). Wells, which officially became an NCAA Division III institution prior to the 1986–87 athletic season, joined the Atlantic Women's Colleges Conference prior to the 1996–97 athletic season. In 1996, the Wells women's soccer team captured the school's only AWCC championship title. Wells offered six intercollegiate athletic sports: field hockey, softball, women's lacrosse, women's soccer, women's swimming and women's tennis.
 
As part of the Board of Trustees decision to begin accepting men to the traditionally all-women's college, Wells in 2005 incorporated men's soccer, men's swimming, and men's and women's cross country into their athletic cadre. 
 
Prior to the 2007–08 academic year, the Express teams were invited to join the North Eastern Athletic Conference and compete against 14 other schools in the East Region. By joining the NEAC, Wells can compete for conference championships with the added benefit of receiving an automatic qualifier in select sports to participate in the NCAA tournament.

Since joining the NEAC, Wells has captured six separate conference championships. Men's swimming won the first league title in 2009–10, and earned a second title in 2012–13. Women's swimming have won three consecutive conference championships, during the 2011–12, 2012–13, and 2013–14 seasons. Men's basketball, who won the NEAC championship in 2010–11, was the first team from Wells to participate in the NCAA Tournament.

As of the 2021–22 athletic season, Wells offers 15 NCAA Division III varsity sports, including field hockey, men's and women's basketball, men's and women's lacrosse, men's and women's soccer, men's and women's swimming, men's and women's volleyball, men's and women's cross country, softball, and baseball.

In the 2018-2019 season the Wells Men’s Volleyball team made it to the Elite 8 (Quarterfinals) in the NCAA Division 3 Men’s Volleyball Tournament before falling to Stevens Institute of Technology.

In the 2019-2020 season, the Wells College Women's swim team won first place in the NEAC swimming championships.

Honor Code
Wells has an honor code to which all students subscribe. By signing the Honor Code, Wells students pledge "not to lie, cheat, steal, deceive, or conceal in the conduct of their collegiate life". Wells allows students to have take-home exams and to work in their residence hall rooms, at the library, or on the dock by the lake rather than only in classrooms.

Notable alumnae

Frances Folsom Cleveland – wife of President Grover Cleveland and First Lady of the United States
Pleasant Rowland – founder of Pleasant Company and creator of the American Girl brand of dolls, books, and accessories
Laura Nader – Professor of Anthropology at the University of California, Berkeley.
Helen Barolini – author of novels and essays
Edith Kinney Gaylord – journalist, philanthropist, founder of Inasmuch Foundation and Ethics and Excellence in Journalism Foundation, and former president of the National Women's Press Club
Mary Beckerle – Ph.D and executive director of the Huntsman Cancer Institute. She is also a fellow of the American Academy of Arts and Sciences.
Helen Tracy Lowe-Porter – translator of Thomas Mann's works
Grace Carew Sheldon (1855–1921), journalist, author, editor, businesswoman
Helena Zachos – faculty member at Cooper Union

Notable faculty
Jesse Bering – psychologist
Robert P. T. Coffin – poet
Frances "Sissy" Farenthold – politician and human rights activist, former Wells president
John D. Graham – painter
Victor Hammer – artist
Paul Hindemith – composer and violist
R. Joseph Hoffmann – historian of religion, humanist activist
J. J. Lankes – artist
Lillian Rosanoff Lieber – mathematician and author
Louise Ropes Loomis  – historian, translator, editor
Lewis H. Morgan – anthropologist
Robert A. Plane – chemist and Wells president 
Thomas J. Preston, Jr. – Wells president pro temp (married Frances Cleveland, widow of Grover Cleveland)
William Stokoe – English professor 
Allen W. Trelease – history professor 
Margaret Floy Washburn – psychologist
William Matthews – poet

References

External links
Official website
Official athletics website

 
Former women's universities and colleges in the United States
Private universities and colleges in New York (state)
Educational institutions established in 1868
Education in Cayuga County, New York
Liberal arts colleges in New York (state)
1868 establishments in New York (state)